Ernst August Wilhelm Steinhoff (February 11, 1908 – December 2, 1987) was a rocket scientist and member of the "von Braun rocket group", at the Peenemünde Army Research Center (1939–1945).  Ernst Steinhoff saw National Socialist (Nazi) doctrines as "ideals" and became a member of the NSDAP in May 1937. He was a glider pilot, holding distance records, and had the honorary Luftwaffe rank of "Flight Captain".

Ernst Steinhoff earned his PhD at the Technische Hochschule Darmstadt (today Technische Universität Darmstadt) in 1940 with a dissertation on aviation instruments.

His younger brother Friedrich Steinhoff assisted rocket experiments while commanding  in 1942.  Ernst was among the scientists to surrender and travel to the United States to provide rocketry expertise via Operation Paperclip.  Friedrich was captured aboard  and committed suicide in a Boston jail before Ernst came to the United States on the first boat, November 16, 1945. with Operation Paperclip and Fort Bliss, Texas (1945-1949).  He then moved to Holloman Air Force Base where he also worked closely with White Sands Missile Range in New Mexico.  He focused on guidance, control, and range instrumentation throughout his career. He was awarded the Decoration for Exceptional Civilian Service in 1958 for his contributions to the US rocket program. In 1979 he was inducted into the New Mexico International Space Hall of Fame.

Steinhoff is being credited as one of the first pioneers to popularize the concept of space resource utilization for Mars exploration. He became the first chairman of Working Group on Extraterrestrial Resources (WGER).

As of 1981, Mrs. Dixie Cantwell of Alamogordo, NM,  was working on researching and writing the biography of "Alamogordo's well-known scientist, Dr. Ernest A Steinhoff". The status of said biography, and its progress remains unknown.

References 

German aerospace engineers
Nazi Party members
Glider pilots
German emigrants to the United States
German rocket scientists
German spaceflight pioneers
1908 births
1987 deaths
Operation Paperclip
Glider flight record holders
German aviation record holders
Technische Universität Darmstadt alumni
People from Schwalmstadt
Engineers from Hesse